Aleksandr Urinov (Александр Уринов, born 24 February 1973) is an Uzbekistani male weightlifter, competing in the 105 kg category and representing Uzbekistan at international competitions. He participated at the 1996 Summer Olympics in the 99 kg event and at the 2004 Summer Olympics in the 105 kg event. He competed at world championships, most recently at the 2006 World Weightlifting Championships.

Urinov was caught for using a cannabis-related substance during the 2006 Asian Games.

Major results

References

External links
 
 
 

1973 births
Living people
Uzbekistani male weightlifters
Weightlifters at the 2004 Summer Olympics
Olympic weightlifters of Uzbekistan
Place of birth missing (living people)
Weightlifters at the 1996 Summer Olympics
Weightlifters at the 2002 Asian Games
Weightlifters at the 2006 Asian Games
Asian Games competitors for Uzbekistan
Weightlifters at the 1998 Asian Games
Doping cases in weightlifting
Uzbekistani sportspeople in doping cases
20th-century Uzbekistani people
21st-century Uzbekistani people